Barbara Bigsby Boyd (born January 31, 1937) is an American politician. She is a member of the Alabama House of Representatives from the 32nd District, serving since 1994. She is a member of the Democratic party. She is the Democratic Caucus Vice Chair and a member of the National Black Caucus of State Legislators.

References

Living people
Democratic Party members of the Alabama House of Representatives
1937 births
African-American state legislators in Alabama
Women state legislators in Alabama
Politicians from Anniston, Alabama
21st-century American politicians
21st-century American women politicians
21st-century African-American women
21st-century African-American politicians
20th-century African-American people
20th-century African-American women